AIM or Aim may refer to:

Computing
 AIM alliance, an Apple-IBM-Motorola alliance
 AIM (software), AOL Instant Messenger
 Fortyfive, a Japanese software development company previously known as AIM

Military
 Abrams Integrated Management
 Airborne intercept missile, US DoD designation for air-to-air missiles such as AIM-7 Sparrow 
 Authoring Instructional Materials,  US Navy training management system
 Pistol Mitralieră model 1963/1965 (AIM, AIMS), Model 63, 65, 90 assault rifles
 Pușcă Automată model 1986 (AIMS-74), Model 86 automatic rifle

Music
 Aim (musician)
 AIM (album), 2016 album by M.I.A.
 "AIM", song by Tyga from the album No Introduction
 "A.I.M.", single by the Cooper Temple Clause from Kick Up the Fire, and Let the Flames Break Loose
 American Institute of Musicology, early music musicological organization
 Anugerah Industri Muzik, Malaysia's annual music awards ceremony
 Australian Institute of Music, Sydney

Organizations
 Accuracy in Media, a conservative American watchdog
 Adult Industry Medical Health Care Foundation, former US non-profit
 Advanced Idea Mechanics, a criminal organization in  Marvel Comics
 Adventures In Missions (Texas)
 Africa Inland Mission, a Christian mission
 Agape International Missions
 Alliance for Independent Madhesh
 Alzheimer's Impact Movement
 American Identity Movement, a white nationalist movement
 American Indian Movement
 American Institute of Mathematics
 Association of Independent Museums
 Association of Independent Music
 Australian Indigenous Ministries, formerly Aborigines Inland Mission

Education
 AIM North London Academy, England
 AIM Academy, Conshohocken, Pennsylvania, United States
 Asian Institute of Management, Makati, Philippines
 Assam Institute of Management, Guwahati, Assam, India

Science
 Aeronomy of Ice in the Mesosphere, a NASA satellite
 Ancestry-informative marker, in genetics
 Asteroid Impact Mission, a cancelled ESA asteroid probe

Other uses
Advanced Idea Mechanics, a fictional organization in the Marvel Comics universe
 Aeronautical Information Manual, North American official guide
 Affect infusion model, in psychology
 Ai Maeda (voice actress), also called AiM
 AIM, or Aboriginal and Islander Message, a successor newspaper to Koori Bina, published in Sydney, Australia (1979–1982)
 Aim (demon), in the Lesser Key of Solomon
 AIM (motorcycle), Italy, 1974–1982
 Aim toothpaste
 Aim (trigraph)
 AIM-65, a computer
 Alternative Investment Market of the London Stock Exchange
 American Indian Movement, a Native American movement
 Arena International Master, a  FIDE chess arena title
 Artificial intelligence marketing, a form of marketing

See also
 AIMS (disambiguation)